The brachial plexus is a network of nerves (nerve plexus) formed by the anterior rami of the lower four cervical nerves and first thoracic nerve (C5, C6, C7, C8, and T1). This plexus extends from the spinal cord, through the cervicoaxillary canal in the neck, over the first rib, and into the armpit, it supplies afferent and efferent nerve fibers to the chest, shoulder, arm, forearm, and hand.

Structure
The brachial plexus is divided into five roots, three trunks, six divisions (three anterior and three posterior), three cords, and five branches. There are five "terminal" branches and numerous other "pre-terminal" or "collateral" branches, such as the subscapular nerve, the thoracodorsal nerve, and the long thoracic nerve, that leave the plexus at various points along its length.  A common structure used to identify part of the brachial plexus in cadaver dissections is the M or W shape made by the musculocutaneous nerve, lateral cord, median nerve, medial cord, and ulnar nerve.

Roots
The five roots are the five anterior primary rami of the spinal nerves, after they have given off their segmental supply to the muscles of the neck.
The brachial plexus emerges at five different levels: C5, C6, C7, C8, and T1.  C5 and C6 merge to establish the upper trunk, C7 continuously forms the middle trunk, and C8 and T1 merge to establish the lower trunk.
Prefixed or postfixed formations in some cases involve C4 or T2, respectively.
The dorsal scapular nerve comes from the superior trunk and innervates the rhomboid muscles which retract and downwardly rotate the scapula.  The subclavian nerve originates in both C5 and C6 and innervates the subclavius, a muscle that involves lifting the first ribs during respiration. The long thoracic nerve arises from C5, C6, and C7. This nerve innervates the serratus anterior, which draws the scapula laterally and is the prime mover in all forward-reaching and pushing actions.

Trunks
These roots merge to form the trunks:
 "superior" or "upper" (C5-C6)
 "middle" (C7)
 "inferior" or "lower" (C8, T1)

Divisions
Each trunk then splits in two, to form six divisions:
 anterior divisions of the upper, middle, and lower trunks
 posterior divisions of the upper, middle, and lower trunks
 when observing the body in the anatomical position, the anterior divisions are superficial to the posterior divisions

Cords
These six divisions regroup to become the three cords or large fiber bundles. The cords are named by their position with respect to the axillary artery.
 The posterior cord is formed from the three posterior divisions of the trunks (C5-C8, T1)
 The lateral cord is formed from the anterior divisions of the upper and middle trunks (C5-C7)
 The medial cord is simply a continuation of the anterior division of the lower trunk (C8, T1)

Diagram

Branches
The branches are listed below. Most branches arise from the cords, but few branches arise (indicated in italics) directly from earlier structures. The five on the left are considered "terminal branches". These terminal branches are the musculocutaneous nerve, the axillary nerve, the radial nerve, the median nerve, and the ulnar nerve. Due to both emerging from the lateral cord the musculocutaneous nerve and the median nerve are well connected. The musculocutaneous nerve has even been shown to send a branch to the median nerve further connecting them.
There have been several variations reported in the branching pattern but these are very rare.

Bold indicates primary spinal root component of nerve. Italics indicate spinal roots that frequently, but not always, contribute to the nerve.

Function
The brachial plexus provides nerve supply to the skin and muscles of the arms, with two exceptions: the trapezius muscle (supplied by the spinal accessory nerve) and an area of skin near the axilla (supplied by the intercostobrachial nerve). The brachial plexus communicates through the sympathetic trunk via gray rami communicantes that join the plexus roots.

The terminal branches of the brachial plexus (musculocutaneous n., axillary n., radial n., median n., and ulnar n.) all have specific sensory, motor and proprioceptive functions.

Clinical significance

Injury

Injury to the brachial plexus may affect sensation or movement of different parts of the arm. Injury can be caused by the shoulder being pushed down and the head being pulled up, which stretches or tears the nerves.  Injuries associated with malpositioning commonly affect the brachial plexus nerves, rather than other peripheral nerve groups.  Due to the brachial plexus nerves being very sensitive to position, there are very limited ways of preventing such injuries.  The most common victims of brachial plexus injuries consist of victims of motor vehicle accidents and newborns.

Injuries can be caused by stretching, diseases, and wounds to the lateral cervical region (posterior triangle) of the neck or the axilla. Depending on the location of the injury, the signs and symptoms can range from complete paralysis to anesthesia. Testing the patient's ability to perform movements and comparing it to their normal side is a method to assess the degree of paralysis. A common brachial plexus injury is from a hard landing where the shoulder widely separates from the neck (such as in the case of motorcycle accidents or falling from a tree). These stretches can cause ruptures to the superior portions of the brachial plexus or avulse the roots from the spinal cord. Upper brachial plexus injuries are frequent in newborns when excessive stretching of the neck occurs during delivery. Studies have shown a relationship between a newborn's weight and brachial plexus injuries; however, the number of cesarean deliveries necessary to prevent a single injury is high at most birth weights. 

For the upper brachial plexus injuries, paralysis occurs in those muscles supplied by C5 and C6 like the deltoid, biceps, brachialis, and brachioradialis. A loss of sensation in the lateral aspect of the upper limb is also common with such injuries. An inferior brachial plexus injury is far less common but can occur when a person grasps something to break a fall or a baby's upper limb is pulled excessively during delivery. In this case, the short muscles of the hand would be affected and cause the inability to form a full fist position.

To differentiate between preganglionic and postganglionic injury, clinical examination requires that the physician keep the following points in mind. Preganglionic injuries cause loss of sensation above the level of the clavicle, pain in an otherwise insensate hand, ipsilateral Horner's syndrome, and loss of function of muscles supplied by branches arising directly from roots—i.e., long thoracic nerve palsy leading to winging of scapula and elevation of ipsilateral diaphragm due to phrenic nerve palsy.

Acute brachial plexus neuritis is a neurological disorder that is characterized by the onset of severe pain in the shoulder region. Additionally, the compression of cords can cause pain radiating down the arm, numbness, paresthesia, erythema, and weakness of the hands. This kind of injury is common for people who have prolonged hyperabduction of the arm when they are performing tasks above their head.

Sports injuries 
One sports injury that is becoming prevalent in contact sports, particularly in the sport of American football, is called a "stinger." An athlete can incur this injury in a collision that can cause cervical axial compression, flexion, or extension of nerve roots or terminal branches of the brachial plexus. In a study conducted on football players at United States Military Academy, researchers found that the most common mechanism of injury is, "the compression of the fixed brachial plexus between the shoulder pad and the superior medial scapula when the pad is pushed into the area of Erb's point, where the brachial plexus is most superficial.". The result of this is a "burning" or "stinging" pain that radiates from the region of the neck to the fingertips. Although this injury causes only a temporary sensation, in some cases it can cause chronic symptoms.

Penetrating wounds 
Most penetration wounds require immediate treatment and are not as easy to repair. For example, a deep knife wound to the brachial plexus could damage and/or sever the nerve. According to where the cut was made, it could inhibit action potentials needed to innervate that nerve's specific muscle or muscles.

Injuries during birth 
Brachial plexus injuries can occur during the delivery of newborns when after the delivery of the head, the anterior shoulder of the infant cannot pass below the pubic symphysis without manipulation. This manipulation can cause the baby's shoulder to stretch, which can damage the brachial plexus to varying degrees. This type of injury is referred to as shoulder dystocia. Shoulder dystocia can cause obstetric brachial plexus palsy (OBPP), which is the actual injury to the brachial plexus. The incidence of OBPP in the United States is 1.5 per 1000 births, while it is lower in the United Kingdom and the Republic of Ireland (0.42 per 1000 births). While there are no known risk factors for OBPP, if a newborn does have shoulder dystocia it increases their risk for OBPP 100-fold. Nerve damage has been connected to birth weight with larger newborns being more susceptible to the injury but it also has to do with the delivery methods. Although very hard to prevent during live birth, doctors must be able to deliver a newborn with precise and gentle movements to decrease chances of injuring the child.

Tumors 
Tumors that may occur in the brachial plexus are schwannomas, neurofibromas and malignant peripheral nerve sheath tumors.

Imaging 
Imaging of the Brachial Plexus can be done effectively by using a higher magnetic strength MRI Scanner like 1.5 T or more.  It is impossible to evaluate the brachial plexuses with plain Xray, CT and ultrasound scanning can manage to view the plexuses to an extent; hence MRI is preferred in imaging brachial plexus over other imaging modalities due to its multiplanar capability and the tissue contrast difference between brachial plexus and adjacent vessels. The plexuses are best imaged in coronal and sagittal planes, but axial images give an idea about the nerve roots. Generally, T1 WI and T2 WI images are used in various planes for the imaging; but new sequences like MR Myelolography, Fiesta 3D and T2 cube are also used in addition to the basic sequences to gather more information to evaluate the anatomy more.

In anaesthetics

See also 
 Plexus
 Nerve plexus
 Cranial nerve
 Spinal nerve
 List of anatomy mnemonics

Additional images

References

Bibliography

External links

 Brachial Plexus Injury/Illustration, Cincinnati Children's Hospital Medical Center
 Learn the Brachial Plexus in Five Minutes or Less by Daniel S. Romm, M.D. and Dennis A. Chu Chu, M.D. 
 Video of the dissected axilla and brachial plexus

Nerve plexus
Nerves of the upper limb